Ching Arellano (June 6, 1960 – February 12, 2011) was a Filipino comedian and actor. He was former mainstay in Batibot.

Early life
Born Francis Anthony A. Arellano on June 6, 1960, in Mary Johnston Hospital, Manila. He grew up in Malabon, Metro Manila.

Early career
Ching Arellano, a theater actor who appeared in numerous films and TV shows in the past three decades. He started his acting career in 1977 at the University of the Philippines Diliman where he took up AB Theater Arts and was an active member of the UP Repertory Company under the tutelage of theater director Professor Behn Cervantes. After college, he continued his career in theater at the Philippine Educational Theater Association (PETA). In 1988, he started appearing on television via the political satire comedy Sic O'Clock News with fellow comedians Ces Quesada and Rene Requiestas playing various roles, notably the character of former president Fidel V. Ramos. Sic O'Clock News was written by Jobart Bartolome and Amado Lacuesta under the direction of Marilou Diaz-Abaya. Shortly after, also in 1988, Arellano joined the Philippines' longest-running children show, Batibot as resident jeepney driver and all-around handyman "Kuya Ching."

Personal life
He was married to writer Che Vista-Arellano  Arellano had a nephew named Drew Arellano who's also an actor and TV host.

Death
Arellano died of heart failure on Saturday, 12 February 2011. He was 50 years old. In 2008, Arellano was diagnosed by a heart specialist as to have had a heart afflicted with atrial fibrillation, in his case, a congenital condition. He was cremated on February 16, 2011, at the Eternal Gardens, Balintawak in Quezon City, Metro Manila.

Filmography

Film

Television

References

External links

1960 births
2011 deaths
People from Malabon
Male actors from Metro Manila
Filipino male comedians
Filipino male television actors
Filipino television personalities
University of the Philippines Diliman alumni